Tan Sri Datuk Chik Mohamad Yusuf bin Sheikh Abdul Rahman (3 March 1907 – 26 June 1975), better known as C.M. Yusuf, was the third Speaker of the Dewan Rakyat, the lower house in the Malaysian Parliament.

The school SMK Dato' Bendahara C.M Yusuf in Tanjung Tualang, Perak is named after him. A road in Ipoh was also named after him.

Biography
C.M. Yusuf received his Bachelor of Arts from the University of Oxford. He was an Orang Besar (traditional positions of authority appointed by the royalty) in the state of Perak, having been conferred the title "Dato' Bendahara Perak" by the Sultan of Perak, Sultan Yusuf Izzuddin Shah, in 1959.

Prior to being elected Speaker, C.M. Yusuf served important positions in the legislature of Malaysia. He was a member of the Malayan Federal Legislative Council, the predecessor to the present-day Parliament, before the independence of Malaya in 1957. He was also a Senator from the state of Perak in the Dewan Negara.

He was elected Speaker of the Dewan Rakyat on 25 November 1964 and served for nearly ten years.

Honour

Honour of Malaysia
  : 
 Commander of the Order of the Defender of the Realm (P.M.N.) - Tan Sri (1972)

References

1907 births
1975 deaths
Speakers of the Dewan Rakyat
United Malays National Organisation politicians
Malaysian Muslims
Malaysian people of Malay descent
People from Perak
20th-century Malaysian lawyers
Alumni of the University of Oxford
Commanders of the Order of the Defender of the Realm